Okja is a 2017 science-fantasy action-adventure film directed by Bong Joon-ho with a screenplay by Bong and Jon Ronson from a story by Bong. The film is about a young girl who raised a genetically modified "super pig" (the titular Okja) and, after she is taken to the United States, goes on a mission to rescue her from mistreatment at the hands of the meat industry. An international co-production of South Korea and the United States, it stars an ensemble cast headed by child actor Ahn Seo-hyun, along with Byun Hee-bong, Yoon Je-moon, Choi Woo-shik, Tilda Swinton, Paul Dano, Steven Yeun, Lily Collins, Shirley Henderson, Daniel Henshall, Devon Bostick, Giancarlo Esposito, and Jake Gyllenhaal.

The film competed for the Palme d'Or in the main competition section at the 2017 Cannes Film Festival. It was released on Netflix on June 28, 2017. The film received positive reviews from critics.

Plot 
In 2007, "environmentalist" Lucy Mirando becomes CEO of the Mirando Corporation, succeeding her twin sister. Announcing they have been breeding a special kind of "super pig", 26 specimens are sent to farmers around the world, and ten years later, one will be crowned the winner as the best pig.

In 2017, a young girl named Mija lives in South Korea with her grandfather and their super pig, Okja. Mija and Okja have a very close relationship; they spend much of their time together, and at one point, Okja saves Mija from falling off a cliff. They are visited by Mirando spokesperson and zoologist Dr. Johnny Wilcox, who declares Okja the best super pig, and announces that they will take her to NYC. Her grandfather gives Mija a gold pig, explaining he saved up to replace Okja when she was taken away. Devastated, Mija goes to Seoul to find Okja, where she sees her being loaded onto a truck. Mija chases down the truck but it is intercepted by the Animal Liberation Front (ALF).

In the resulting chaos, Mija and Okja run away but are eventually saved by the ALF, led by Jay. He asks another ALF member, K, to translate and tell Mija that they plan to put a recording device in Okja's ear and let her be recaptured by the Mirando Corporation to document how they mistreat animals. Mija asks them to return her to the mountains but K purposely mistranslates and tells them Mija agrees. They leave, and Okja is recaptured.

To minimize PR damage to the company, Lucy pays for Mija to come to NYC to reunite with her pig. Okja is taken to a laboratory where she is forcibly bred with another super pig and flesh is taken from her for a taste test. After the ALF sees the footage, K reveals that he lied to the rest of the group about Mija's support of the plan. Jay beats K, and expels him from the ALF.

In NYC, Mija has to comply with the Mirando Corp. Jay slips into her room and tells her they plan to rescue Okja while on stage. During the Mirando parade, a battered and temporarily blinded Okja attacks Mija. Jay tries to hurt Okja to protect the girl, but Mija doesn’t let him and calms Okja down. The ALF shows Okja's mistreatment to the public, who quickly turn on Mirando. Lucy surrenders the company to her twin sister Nancy, who contacts a private security firm to take out ALF members. Okja is recaptured and the ALF members are arrested, except for Mija and Jay, who are rescued by K. Nancy, Lucy’s twin sister, reassumes the position of CEO and starts full-time operations at their slaughterhouse.

K, Mija, and Jay travel to a processing plant in search of Okja, and find her at the processing plant, being forced up a ramp into a slaughterhouse. Mija shows a Mirando employee a photo of herself with baby Okja, prompting him to stop. Nancy arrives and Mija offers the gold pig in exchange for Okja's life. Nancy agrees, having Jay and K arrested. As Mija and Okja are escorted away, a pair of super pigs push their newborn to Okja to hide it and take it away.

Back in the countryside, Mija resumes her life with her grandfather, Okja, and the new piglet.

In a post-credits scene, Jay is released from prison, boarding a bus with K and the other members of the organization. With their newest member Kim Woo-shik, a former driver for Mirando Corporation, they plan to disrupt a major Mirando shareholders meeting.

Cast 
 Ahn Seo-hyun as Mija, the protagonist, a young farm girl who takes care of and helped raise Okja.
 Tilda Swinton as Lucy Mirando, the eccentric powerful CEO of the Mirando Corporation looking to profit from Okja and the super pig program.
 Swinton also plays Nancy Mirando, Lucy's twin sister, the cruel former CEO of the Mirando Corporation
 Paul Dano as Jay, the leader of an animal-rights activist group, the Animal Liberation Front (ALF)
 Jake Gyllenhaal as Johnny Wilcox, a disturbed zoologist and TV personality
 Byun Hee-bong as Hee Bong, Mija's grandfather
 Steven Yeun as K, an animal-rights activist and ALF member who serves as translator between Mija and the rest of the ALF
 Giancarlo Esposito as Frank Dawson, an executive with the Mirando Corporation
 Lily Collins as Red, an animal-rights activist and ALF member
 Yoon Je-moon as Mundo Park, a Korean representative of the Mirando Corporation
 Shirley Henderson as Jennifer, Lucy's assistant
 Daniel Henshall as Blond, an animal-rights activist, ALF member, and the boyfriend of Silver
 Devon Bostick as Silver, an animal-rights activist, ALF member, and the boyfriend of Blond
 Choi Woo-shik as Kim Woo-shik, a young driver for the Mirando Corporation
 Lee Jung-eun as Okja's voice / Wheelchair woman
 Lee Bong-ryun as Mirando Korea desk clerk

Development and production 
In October 2015, it was announced that director Bong Joon-ho's next film would feature a South Korean female lead and a cast of English-speaking supporting actors, with filming set in New York. On November 10, 2015, it was picked up by Netflix and Plan B Entertainment with a budget of $50 million, with production starting in late 2016 for release in 2017. Darius Khondji joined the film as cinematographer in February 2016.

Bong sought out Welsh author Jon Ronson to help with the script. Working with a rough draft of the story, Ronson helped develop the English-speaking characters.

Principal photography began on April 22, 2016, in Seoul, South Korea. It moved to Vancouver, British Columbia, Canada for more filming on July 31, 2016. Bong visited a Colorado slaughterhouse to prepare for the film's slaughterhouse sequence, an experience that converted Bong and producer Dooho Choi into temporary vegans. Bong has called Okja "a very shy and introverted animal. It's a unique animal that we've not seen before." Filming wrapped on August 27, 2016.

Themes 
In an interview, Bong said the film touched on "capitalism". Co-writer Jon Ronson said he believed the movie would "turn people vegetarian", adding, "I really don’t think that was my intention or Bong’s intention".

Release

Okja had its world premiere at the 2017 Cannes Film Festival on May 18, 2017. During the first few minutes of its screening at its Cannes premiere, the film was met with boos mixed with some applause twice: once when the Netflix logo appeared on the screen and again during a technical glitch which projected the film in an incorrect aspect ratio for its first seven minutes. The festival later issued an apology to its filmmakers for projecting the film incorrectly. But despite the initial negative audience response, the film received a four-minute standing ovation at its end.

The film was released on Netflix on June 28, 2017. The movie was released as part of the Criterion Collection in July 2022.

Reception

Box office
Several independent theatres in South Korea screened the film to much success, with earnings totalling 2.3 billion KRW ($2.1 million USD) from 300,953 tickets sold.

Critical response
On the film review aggregator website Rotten Tomatoes, the film has an approval rating of 86% based on 236 reviews, with a weighted average of 7.5/10. The website's critical consensus reads, "Okja sees Bong Joon-ho continuing to create defiantly eclectic entertainment – and still hitting more than enough of his narrative targets in the midst of a tricky tonal juggling act." On Metacritic, the film has a weighted average score of 75 out of 100, based on 36 critics, indicating "generally favorable reviews".

Okja was named as one of the New York Timess ten most influential films of the decade in November 2019. Critic A.O. Scott wrote, "Okja is a miracle of imagination and technique, and Okja insists, with abundant mischief and absolute sincerity, that she possesses a soul."

Accolades

See also
Genetically modified food
Meat industry
Meishan pig

References

External links
 
 

2010s action adventure films
2017 films
Animal adventure films
American action adventure films
South Korean action adventure films
Eco-terrorism in fiction
Korean-language Netflix original films
English-language South Korean films
Films about animal rights
Films about animal cruelty
Films about pigs
Films directed by Bong Joon-ho
Films produced by Bong Joon-ho
Films set in 2007
Films set in 2017
Films set in Gangwon Province, South Korea
Films set in New York City
Films set in Seoul
Films shot in Seoul
Films shot in Vancouver
2010s Korean-language films
American multilingual films
South Korean multilingual films
English-language Netflix original films
Plan B Entertainment films
2017 multilingual films
2010s American films
2010s South Korean films